The Opel Ascona is a large family car (D-segment in Europe) that was produced by the German automaker Opel from 1970 to 1988. It was produced in three separate generations, beginning with rear-wheel-drive and ending up as a front-wheel drive J-car derivative.

The Ascona took its name from the lakeside resort of that name in Ticino, Switzerland, and already in the 1950s a special edition of the Opel Rekord P1 was sold as an Opel Ascona in Switzerland, where the name was again used in 1968 for a locally adapted version of the Opel Kadett B into which the manufacturers had persuaded a 1.7-litre engine borrowed from the larger Rekord model of the time. The Opel Ascona A launched in 1970 and sold across Europe was, however, the first mainstream Opel model to carry the name.

The Ascona was introduced in September 1970, lasting for 18 years and 3 generations and ended production in August 1988, to be replaced by the Opel Vectra A.

In motorsport, Walter Röhrl won the 1982 World Rally Championship drivers' title with an Ascona 400.

Ascona A (1970–1975)

In the fall of 1970, Opel presented its completely new vehicle range in Rüsselsheim (internal project code 1.450). The Opel Manta coupé was launched on September 9, followed by the Opel Ascona on October 28 in two- and four-door sedan forms, plus a three-door station wagon called the Caravan or Voyage. These models were positioned between the existing Opel Kadett and the Opel Rekord.

The Ascona was developed as a replacement to the Kadett, but late in the car's development Opel chose to instead develop a new, smaller Kadett and instead positioned the Ascona as a competitor to the successful Ford mid-sized Taunus range. The Opel Ascona A stayed in production until 1975. By that time, almost 692,000 vehicles of the first series had been produced.

The range featured petrol engines from 1.2 L to 1.9 L, with power between 60 PS (44 kW) and 90 PS (66 kW). The 1.2 L had an overhead valve (OHV) head, while the 1.6 L and 1.9 L featured the Opel cam-in-head engine (CIH). The CIH was a compromise effort, with the camshaft mounted next to the valves rather than above them. All used a single barrel carburetor. Even with this simple design, the Ascona 1.9 SR had a successful career in motorsports, with Walter Röhrl winning the European Rally Championship in 1974. Tuner Steinmetz developed a special version of the Ascona SR, with two single-barrel Solex carburettors, lifting power to 125 PS (92 kW).

Engines
1.2 S – 1,196 cc, 60 PS (44 kW)
1.6 N – 1,584 cc, 60–68 PS (44–50 kW)
1.6 S – 1,584 cc, 75–80 PS (55–59 kW)
1.9 S – 1,897 cc, 88–90 PS (65–66 kW)

Opel 1900 (US)
From 1971 to 1975, the 1.9-liter Ascona was exported to the United States as the "Opel 1900" and sold through Buick-Opel dealerships. All three body styles were offered at first, but the four-door sedan was dropped after 1973. In 1974, heavy rubber-clad impact bumpers were added in response to federal regulations. All Opels sold in the US in 1975 were equipped with Bosch L-Jetronic fuel injection, which was not available on the European versions. The fuel injection was added because of the stricter emissions requirements that were in force that year.

Due to the unfavorable Deutsche Mark to US dollar exchange rate, all Opels in Buick showrooms were replaced by Japanese-built Isuzu Geminis wearing Opel badges after 1975.

Ascona B (1975–1981)

The second generation Opel Ascona B was presented in August 1975 at the Frankfurt Motor Show. It was available as a two or four-door saloon. There were related two and three-door coupé models in the Opel Manta range. There was no estate ("Caravan") body available.

The Ascona B retained the same engine range as its predecessor, versions with higher compression ratio and needing 98 octane petrol, dubbed S, were available alongside the 90 octane models. The first change took place in January 1976, when laminated window glass became available as a no-cost option. The 1.9 L "S" cam-in-head engine was replaced by the modernised 2.0 L (20S) in September 1977. The 20N became available in January 1978, and all models now also received electric windscreen washers. A 2.0 L diesel motor was added to the Ascona B range in 1978, mostly targeted at the Benelux countries and Italy, where local tax structures provided an incentive for diesel-powered automobiles - in 1979, 97% of diesels were exported, while 59% of petrol powered cars went in the export.

In January 1979 the street legal version of the Ascona 400 with 2.4-liter engine (16 valves, 144 PS) appeared, followed a month later by the more prosaic 1.3 liter OHC engine. This largely replaced the old 1.2 liter pushrod unit which dated back to 1962, but production continued in dwindling numbers into 1980 for some export markets.

In September 1979 the Ascona received a minor facelift, including plastic bumpers and a grey front grille with a larger mesh. The 2.0 E model with a Bosch L-Jetronic electronic fuel injection arrived in January 1980, after having been first installed in the Manta and Rekord models. In addition to a front spoiler, the 2.0 E equipped Ascona also received an upgraded clutch and transmission, differential, radiator, and other parts shared with the sporting Manta GT/E. In January 1981 the Ascona underwent its last changes, when adjustments made to the 16N and 20N engines. The 1.9 N and 2.0 N engines were discontinued in the German market, while the 1.6 N engine was now only available coupled with an automatic transmission.

Over 1.2 million Ascona B units were produced worldwide until August 1981. The two millionth Ascona was an Ascona B, built in April 1980, and the one millionth Ascona sold in Germany was registered in July of that same year. The related Manta coupé versions however, remained in production until 1988.

Engines
1.2 N – 1196 cc, 
1.2 S – 1196 cc,  - 58 PS in Sweden and Switzerland (S12S)
1.3 N – 1297 cc, 
1.3 S – 1297 cc, 
1.6 N – 1584 cc, 
1.6 S – 1584 cc, later 
1.9 N – 1897 cc, 
1.9 S – 1897 cc, 
2.0 N – 1979 cc, 
2.0 S – 1979 cc, 
2.0 E – 1979 cc, 
2.4 E – 2420 cc, 
2.0 D – 1998 cc,

Export models
In the United Kingdom, the Vauxhall Cavalier badge was used on both saloon and coupé models from late 1975, which came out of the same factory in Belgium — the first Vauxhall to be built abroad. The front ends were different, featuring Vauxhall's trademark "droop snoot", as designed by Wayne Cherry.

 South Africa
In South Africa there was a locally assembled version called the Chevrolet Ascona, identical in many respects to the four-door Opel Ascona B. The Ascona came with a locally built 1.3 liter inline-four from the Vauxhall Viva. A preceding upmarket version with the Vauxhall Cavalier's longer front end was sold as the Chevrolet Chevair, equipped with bigger engines of Chevrolet origins. The Ascona was launched in July 1978, and replaced the Vauxhall-based Chevrolet 1300/1900-series. It was available in De Luxe or S trim, with the S receiving a sportier treatment with a three-spoke steering wheel, tartan seat inserts, and Rostyle rims.

Ascona 400 rally car

First shown at Frankfurt in September 1979, the Ascona 400 was a homologation special sold only to make it eligible for rallying's Group 4 category. The Ascona 400s were built at General Motors' plant in Antwerp. The 1980 world champion Walter Röhrl took the rally car to victory and won the World Rally Championship drivers' title in the 1982 season.

The car was developed by Opel alongside the Manta B 400 model which consisted of the same changes. Irmscher and Cosworth were hired as partners for the project, Cosworth to deliver a 16 valve double cam crossflow head for the engine, and Irmscher for the exterior and interior styling. Cosworth delivered the heads to Opel and Opel soon discovered a major mistake. The plan was to use the 2.0 litre engine block but this did not produce enough power. Time was running out and Opel badly needed to do something. Opel took the 2.0E block, installed forged pistons, different connecting-rods, and forged crankshaft with 85mm stroke. The result was a 2.4 litre engine. The 2.4 litre engine gave rise to some massive power outputs using the 16 valve head. The street versions of the 400 therefore came with  engines, using the Bosch fuel injection of the Manta GSi and GT/E series.

Irmscher delivered the rally trim for the exterior. Large and widened wings, light weight hood, front wings, rear boot lid and doors were also installed.

By 1984, the Audi Quattro appeared more powerful than ever and the Ascona 400 was rendered obsolete. But the Ascona 400 still has some remarkable records. The Ascona 400 was the last rear wheel drive rally car to win the drivers' world championship, ensuring its place in motorsports history.

WRC victories

{|class="wikitable" style="font-size: 95%; "
! No.
! Event
! Season
! Driver
! Co-driver
! Car
|-
| 1
|  30th International Swedish Rally
| 1980
|  Anders Kulläng
|  Bruno Berglund
| Opel Ascona 400
|-
| 2
|  50éme Rallye Automobile de Monte Carlo
| 1982
|  Walter Röhrl
|  Christian Geistdörfer
| Opel Ascona 400
|-
| 3
|  14ème Rallye Côte d'Ivoire
| 1982
|  Walter Röhrl
|  Christian Geistdörfer
| Opel Ascona 400
|-
| 4
|  31st Marlboro Safari Rally
| 1983
|  Ari Vatanen
|  Terry Harryman
| Opel Ascona 400
|-
|}

Ascona C (1981–1988)

The Ascona C was launched in August 1981 as part of General Motors' J-car project. This was Opel's second front-wheel drive car since the introduction of the Kadett D in 1979. This car was manufactured in Rüsselsheim, Germany, Antwerp, Belgium, São Caetano do Sul, Brazil and Luton, England, and was sold in the UK under the name Vauxhall Cavalier and as the Chevrolet Monza in Latin America. The Cavalier Coupé was phased out, but the Opel Manta was retained in the UK (the last car to be badged as an Opel in the UK before the brand was phased out there in 1988). There were no longer sheet metal differences between Opel and Vauxhall models after 1982. The Ascona C won the "Goldenes Lenkrad" (Golden Steering Wheel) award at the end of 1981 and was West Germany's biggest selling car. The new Ascona no longer had the sporty character of its predecessors, being a more unadulterated family car which was considerably more space-efficient than earlier models.

It was narrowly beaten to the European Car of the Year award by the Renault 9 in 1982. It took another 27 years before its successor model, the Opel Insignia, won the 2009 European Car of the Year award by only 1 point, from the Second placed Ford Fiesta. The Ascona C underwent two notable facelifts during its term of production.

The range added an option of a five-door fastback/hatchback Bodystyle, named CC in a few markets - short for "Combi Coupé." The hatchback model was shorter than the saloons, with a marginally smaller luggage compartment and  less headspace in the backseat. All engines were now SOHC crossflow designs with a breakerless ignition system and hydraulic tappets. The base model was the 1.3 L introduced in 1978 in the Ascona B, with 60 PS (44 kW), followed by a 1.6 L with 75 PS (55 kW). "S" versions with higher compression ratio had power increased by as much as twenty per cent. The top of the line was the sporty GTE model, with electronic fuel injection, pushing power to 130  PS (96 kW) in the last two model years. Diesel power came from an Isuzu-developed block, with 1.6  litres. Catalytic converters were optional in the larger petrol units starting from 1986.

The Ascona C was also assembled in South Africa, where it was sold by GM South Africa, replacing the Chevrolet Ascona which was based on the Ascona B. It was dropped in 1986 and replaced by a sedan version of the Kadett E called the Opel Monza.

As before, there was no estate car version of the Ascona, although Vauxhall in the UK brought in the rear ends of the Holden Camira wagon (estate car) and adapted them to the Cavalier beginning with the 1984 model year. Opel continued to use the Ascona nameplate until the Vectra was launched in 1988, while the Cavalier name was retained by Vauxhall until 1995.

 Timeline
September 1981 – Introduction of the Ascona C as the successor for the Ascona B. This, the original version, is usually referred to as "C1" to distinguish it from the later, facelifted versions. Available bodystyles for the Ascona included 2- and 4-door Sedans and a 5-door Hatchback (the CC). Initial engine choice included the 1.3N (60 PS), 1.3S (75 PS), 1.6N (75 PS) and 1.6S (90 PS), all of which had a four-speed gearbox or optional three-speed automatic transmission for all except the 1.3 N. Trim variations included Base, L, Berlina and SR.
1982 – Introduction of the Ascona Diesel with a 1.6 (55 PS) engine, available with a five-speed gearbox. Introduction of the Ascona CD with higher level of equipment. A new 1.8E engine with LE-Jetronic (115 PS) and five-speed gearbox is introduced in September. Optional power steering, electric windows, electric mirrors and computer available at extra cost. The five-speed transmission was now also made available in the 1.6S. Introduction of Chevrolet Monza in Brazil, with a 1.6 engine and 3 door hatchback body style. Later the 1.8 engine was made available.
1983 – Modified ignition switch and door locks. Improvements made to water pump, valve seals and radiator hoses. Aftermarket convertibles were now available from Keinath (later also by Hammond & Thiede). Optional central locking and heated mirrors. Optional Sports suspension available for SR and 1.8 E engine. Automatically adjustable rear brakes now standard. As of May, the five-speed transmission was available in all models. Introduction of 2 and 4 door sedan bodystyle in Brazil.
1984 – C2: All models have a facelift with new CD-style radiator grille, new wheel trims, new front seat mountings, modified centre console, remote-adjustable door mirrors and height-adjustable steering wheel. 1.3S engine now has a new start-stop system. Improved clutch damping and headlight seals. Model names also changed: Base becomes LS, L becomes GL, Berlina becomes GLS, and SR becomes GT.
1985 – 1.8i engine with three-way catalyst introduced (100 PS). This engine was built in Rüsselsheim and only installed in cars built in that plant, meaning that it was not available in the two-door bodywork as that style was only manufactured in Antwerp. One-way catalysts are available for all engines. Modified clutch lining and door seals.
1986 – C3: All models are facelifted, this time with clear front indicator lenses, dark taillight lenses with fewer ridges, colour-keyed radiator grille, air vent, and front spoiler. GT now has front and rear spoilers. The 1.3 was no longer available in the German market.
1987 – Non-catalyst 2.0i replaced by  20SEH version, only available with GT trim. Introduction of 2.0 engine in Brazil.
1988 – The GL model changes name to "Touring" (already used in 1986 for the last of the C2 Ascona's). August marks the end of production for the Ascona C, replaced by the Opel Vectra A.
1990 - 2 and 4 door sedan models are facelifted in Brazil.
1991 - Electronic fuel injection is adopted in Brazil.
1996 - End of production in Brazil.

 Models
The following versions of the Ascona C were available, all with inline fours. Data is for the German market. There were certain differences in various export market models:

Chevrolet Monza
In Brazil, the Ascona C was sold from May 1982 until 1996 as the Chevrolet Monza. Chevrolet did not use the Ascona brand because the Spanish and Portuguese word "asco" means "disgust, repugnance". Instead, it was named after the famous Italian circuit.

It was originally only available as a three-door hatchback, a body style unique to Latin America. However, two and four-door sedans appeared in March 1983. GM do Brasil also considered offering the Monza as a station wagon, and produced two full-size clay models, one with five doors and one with three doors, with a similar rear to the Holden Camira in Australia, which was also used as the basis of the Vauxhall Cavalier in the UK, but it never entered into production. However, Envemo began converting the four-door Monza sedan into a station wagon called the Camping, although it retained the rear doors and taillights of the sedan. Envemo also converted the two-door Monza sedan into a convertible. In 1989 the slow-selling liftback was discontinued, leaving only the two- and four-door three-box sedans. 

These were changed to more powerful 1.8 and 2.0s in 1986.

The Monza received a number of facelifts, the last one bringing its looks in line with those of current European GM products, with new fenders front and rear to accommodate new head and taillights. Diesel versions were available for export markets, most notably Uruguay and Argentina, powered by Isuzu's 4EC1 engine.

The Monza first went on sale in Colombia in 1985 in a 4-door sedan body style, assembled locally by GM Colmotores. In Colombia, a top of the line sedan version was sold from 1987 to 1992 as the Monza Classic with a three-speed automatic transmission. In Venezuela it was assembled and sold from 1985 to 1990. Originally it was equipped with a carbureted 1.8-litre engine, but this was later replaced with a fuel-injected 2-litre unit.

References

External links

 Vauxhall Cavalier and Chevette Club - A vibrant Club that caters for owners, enthusiasts and restorers of the Vauxhall Cavalier MK1, Mk2 and Mk3
 Unofficial Opel website
 Opel Ascona C
 Classic Opel Parts database contain Ascona part information
 Website dedicated to the Opel Ascona B

Ascona
Rear-wheel-drive vehicles
Mid-size cars
Cars introduced in 1970
Hatchbacks
Sedans
Station wagons
1980s cars
Group 4 (racing) cars
Cars discontinued in 1996